Johan George Cortlever (4 August 1885 in Amsterdam – 14 April 1972 in Amsterdam) was a Dutch backstroke swimmer and water polo player who competed in the 1908 Summer Olympics and in the 1920 Summer Olympics.

In 1908, he competed in the 100 metre backstroke competition, but he was eliminated in the first round.

He was part of the Dutch water polo team, which finished fourth in the 1908 tournament.

Twelve years later he was a member of the Dutch water polo team, which finished sixth in the 1920 tournament.

References

External links
Johan Cortlever at Sports-reference.com

1885 births
1972 deaths
Dutch male backstroke swimmers
Dutch male water polo players
Olympic swimmers of the Netherlands
Olympic water polo players of the Netherlands
Swimmers at the 1908 Summer Olympics
Water polo players at the 1908 Summer Olympics
Water polo players at the 1920 Summer Olympics
Swimmers from Amsterdam
20th-century Dutch people